The 9th National Geographic Bee was held in Washington, D.C. on May 28, 1997, sponsored by the National Geographic Society. The final competition was moderated by Jeopardy! host Alex Trebek. The winner was Alex Kerchner of Kamiakin Junior High School in Kirkland, Washington, who won a $25,000 college scholarship. The 2nd-place winner,  Steve Sreckovic of South Milwaukee, Wisconsin, won a $15,000 scholarship. The 3rd-place winner, Justin Mosel of Orchard, Nebraska, won a $10,000 scholarship.

References

External links
 National Geographic Bee Official Website

National Geographic Bee